Alexandre Lazarian is an astrophysicist. He is a professor of astronomy at the University of Wisconsin–Madison with a joint appointment at the Department of Physics. He is a fellow of the American Physical Society.

Career

Lazarian obtained his Diploma in the theoretical physics group led by Vitaly Ginzburg. He received his PhD in 1994 from University of Cambridge under supervision of Martin Rees. After his PhD, Lazarian spent three years as a postdoc in Princeton University and one year as Research Associate at Canadian Institute for Theoretical Astrophysics. Since 1998, he has been working as a professor at the University of Wisconsin–Madison. His research involves MHD Theory, Magnetic Reconnection, Dynamo Theory and Interstellar Dust.

Selected publications

Awards
 2021 Ronald C. Davidson Award for Plasma Physics 
 2012 Fellow of American Physical Society, American Physical Society (2012)
 2010 Humbold Research Award, Alexander von Humboldt Foundation.

References

External links 
A. Lazarian's UW-Madison Page

Year of birth missing (living people)
Living people
American astrophysicists
Alumni of the University of Cambridge
Fellows of the American Physical Society
20th-century physicists
Humboldt Research Award recipients
21st-century physicists
University of Wisconsin–Madison faculty